Fatma Othman Ali (born 28 September 1950) is a Tanzanian politician who served as a member of parliament in the 9th Tanzanian Parliament. She is a member of the ruling Chama Cha Mapinduzi party.

References

1950 births
Living people
Chama Cha Mapinduzi politicians
21st-century Tanzanian women politicians